Argentina — Safeguard Measures on Imports of Footwear or Argentina — Footwear (EC) or WT/DS121 is a WTO Dispute Settlement case that was initiated by a complaint made by the European Communities against Argentina. The decision in this case was based on "parallelism" and represents the first deployment of that concept.

Argentina — Safeguard Measures on Imports of Footwear or WT/DS123 is one case of international economic law proposed by the Government of Indonesia on April 22, 1998, to the World Trade Organization (WTO) relating to protection measures taken by the Government of Argentina in safety footwear imports. The protection measures to which this case relates are the same measures that were in issue in WT/DS121.  This dispute ends with a statement issued by the WTO that Argentina has been proved to have violated the above paragraph of Article XIX of GATT 1994 and 1A in the Safeguards Agreement - WTO.

See also
List of WTO dispute settlement cases

References

External links
WTO - WT/DS164
Official list of all WTO dispute settlement cases

World Trade Organization dispute settlement cases
Shoe business
Economic history of Argentina
Foreign trade of Argentina